Glory is a fictional character in the television series Buffy the Vampire Slayer portrayed by Clare Kramer. Glory is a god from a hell dimension and was the major antagonist of the fifth season, appearing first in episode 5, with her name mentioned in 5 episodes and appearances in 12 others to end season 5.

Character biography

History
The fictional character Glorificus (also regarded as "Glory") portrays a tyrant who revels in the suffering of others. Her reign of terror seemed unstoppable, and her ambition was unquenchable. She quickly became the most powerful of the three hell gods. Fearful that Glorificus would seize total control of the dimension for herself, the two other gods aligned and went to war against her. The hell gods barely defeated her, but, despite their victory, she was too powerful to destroy. They banished her into the earthly dimension, where her essence would be imprisoned in a human child named Ben. Created solely to "contain" her, upon his death as a mortal, Glory would be permanently sealed away.

However, Glory was too powerful for Ben to resist, and he found himself succumbing to her demands. He was increasingly unable to make decisions without her approval. She had become the sole decision-maker in the relationship, leaving him feeling helpless and frustrated. This female possessed superhuman strength, speed, and invulnerability. Glory's strength was greater than that of any Slayer, vampire, or demon on Earth. But her powers were weak when compared with those she had in her true form. Dark magicks prevent humans from learning that Glory and Ben are the same; even if she transforms right in front of someone, they will have no memory of the incident. The spell does not affect supernatural creatures like vampires and demons. This becomes a recurring joke in the penultimate episode of Season Five, where Spike finds himself repeatedly having to explain that Ben and Glory are the same person, only for people to either misunderstand him or forget about him instantly. As Ben and Glory's personalities begin to merge more (see below), the magic weakens until, in the finale, the whole gang can see through it. This human form is Glory's only weakness; if the human vessel containing her is killed, then Glory perishes with him.

In the series, Glory's goal is to find the Key, a "mystical energy nexus," which is the only way for her to return to her original dimension. Unfortunately, using the Key will break down the barriers between all dimensions, causing all worlds to bleed into each other and allowing "Hell to reign on Earth". The Key was safeguarded by an ancient group of monks known as The Order of Dagon. When they discovered that "The Beast" (Glory) was searching for the Key, they chose to hide it. Using ancient magic, they transformed the Key into a human girl. They placed her under the protection of the Slayer Buffy, altering the memories of the Slayer and anyone connected to her into believing the girl was Buffy's younger sister Dawn. Glory eventually destroyed the Order of Dagon. The last monk of the order was taken prisoner and interrogated by Glory and later rescued by Buffy. Before the monk died from his wounds, he revealed to Glory (under torture) that the Key had been transformed, but not what the Key had become. After being rescued by Buffy, the monk revealed to Buffy that Dawn was the Key, something she already suspected.

Glory was also opposed by a military order known as the "Knights of Byzantium," composed of knights and clerics. They swore to prevent Glory from using the Key, and they attempted to kill Dawn before she could be found by Glory. In the episode "Spiral," a large group of knights besieges Buffy and Dawn, but Glory arrives and slaughters nearly all of them, taking the Key with her.

The Key
The Key is an ancient power, an ancient green mystical energy that, according to Glory, "is almost as old as she is." The Key needs to draw on powers from the dimension it's in before being used, which is why it can only be used at a certain time and a certain place. Who or what created the Key or how is unknown; even its true purpose is never fully revealed. The Key seems to work by destroying the barriers that separate one dimension from another. The longer the key is in use, the more the walls of reality begin to break down. When the key is activated, a small portal opens and begins to grow, in which demons, creatures, and entire dimensions begin to immediately bleed through.

Buffy's first confrontation with Glory came shortly after she discovered there was something not right about Dawn. Buffy tried to go up against Glory and failed miserably. Glory beat Buffy severely, destroying an entire building in the process. The only thing Buffy managed to do was escape during a temper tantrum by Glory, which caused the building to collapse. She escaped with the last surviving monk who quickly revealed to her the truth about Dawn being the Key and Buffy as her protector.

Sunnydale

Although Glory enters early on in season 5, the Scooby Gang knows very little about her, only discovering her name from one of Glory's minions. Glory's god-like status, extreme power level, origins, key's true nature, and history are not known until later episodes. Glory comes to Sunnydale looking for "The Key," which will allow her to return to her own dimension. The Key would cause damage to all dimensions, including the dimension Buffy and her friends inhabit, though Glory seems to be unaware or unconcerned of this fact. Glory is not aware of what form the Key has taken, though she knows that Buffy protects it. For her part, Buffy is not initially aware of the Key's nature either. It is eventually revealed that Buffy's "new sister" Dawn is the Key in human form.

She begins the quest to locate the Key, aided by a race of pale, black-eyed demons who are loyal to her almost to a fault, though she does not care for them and viciously abuses them, both verbally and physically, for even the slightest failures. Glory quickly establishes herself as one of Buffy's most dangerous and determined enemies. At one point, she confronts Buffy in her own home, openly threatening to kill Buffy's friends and family and force Buffy to watch her do so.

Glory is a god in a human body; the human mind can not control such power, which gradually turns Glory insane. To maintain her sanity and power, Glory feeds off humans' mental energies through a process that Buffy and her friends refer to as "brain-sucking". She inserts her fingers into the victim's head, absorbing the energies that bind the victim's mind. The humans that she "devours" in this way become incoherent and mentally unstable; those affected can also see Dawn in her true form. An inexplicable increase follows Glory's arrival in Sunnydale in the number of people with a mental health condition. One of her unfortunate victims is Willow's girlfriend, Tara, who later inadvertently betrays Dawn to Glory. The Scoobies (Buffy and her friends) try to run, but Glory still manages to kidnap Dawn shortly afterward. 

The Key can only be used at a certain time, and as that time draws near, the power that separates Glory from Ben dissolves. They still inhabit Ben's body separately, but their memories and personalities begin to blur together.

After recovering from a mental breakdown caused by Glory's kidnapping of Dawn, Buffy decides to attack Glory with everything she has: Willow's magic spell to restore Tara's sanity stolen by Glory, at the same time weakening Glory's mind; the Dagon Sphere (a weapon created by the monks that cause physical pain to Glory); Buffy's robot double (the "Buffybot"), originally Spike's sex toy; Olaf, The Troll God's Hammer (with which Buffy can beat Glory in battle and severely weaken her albeit temporarily, due to the hammer being a weapon of the gods); and eventually a wrecking ball, commandeered by Xander. Glory is left defeated and significantly weakened, losing her hold on this reality and returning to the form and mind of Ben. Buffy then tells Ben to tell Glory to leave Sunnydale and never return. As Buffy walks off, Giles knows that Glory will eventually regain her power and return to get her revenge on Buffy unless Ben is killed, so he smothers Ben to death with his bare hands, ensuring that Glory can never return. Meanwhile, Spike, Giles, and Anya attack her minions. The final spell that opens the rift between dimensions had already been started by one of Glory's disciples - Doc - by cutting Dawn with a knife and making her bleed (the act of which opens a portal to the other dimensions). After killing Doc, Buffy realizes that because the monks created Dawn from her essence, they share the same blood, which means not only Dawn's blood but her own can close the portal, but it would also require her to die (her blood must stop flowing for the gateway to close). After saying goodbye to her sister, Buffy jumps into the opening portal, instantly dying and closing the gateway.

Glory is also referred to as "Glorificus" by her minions and in most textual references, and occasionally as "The Beast" by the monks who created Dawn (although she has nothing to do with The Beast who appeared in Angel, the spin-off series of Buffy the Vampire Slayer).

After Glory's defeat, her final appearance in the series is at the end of the episode "Lessons," as an avatar of the First Evil along with most of the other major villains from the series.

Name
"That Which Cannot Be Named" came into existence before written word, and therefore (as its title implies) has no name. When the hell-god came to this dimension, she was dubbed "Glorificus" or sometimes "Glorifius," names which she shortened to "Glory." She was also known as "the Glorious One" (among many other amusing, groveling titles such as "Her Splendiferousness," "Her Sparkling Luminescence" and "Oh Sweaty-Naughty-Feelings-Causing One") by her demon minions, and as "the Beast" or "the Abomination" by the human priesthood and the Knights of Byzantium. The Scooby Gang and Ben often refer to her by the insulting name of "Hell-Bitch."

According to Jane Espenson, Glory was originally named Cherry.

Powers and abilities
In Season 5, Episode 13, "Blood Ties," the gang begins discussing the Watcher Council's research on Glory. Buffy asks whether or not Glory, as a god, can summon elements like lightning. Giles responds, "Normally, yes, but since she is in human form, her powers are severely limited." During season five the following were demonstrated:
 Near-invulnerability: Only a Troll God's hammer was able to do any lasting damage to Glory when used repeatedly. In "Tough Love," Willow's lightning bolts caused her pain, but caused no visible damage, though she comments that Willow's assault "slowed her down". By the time of the season finale, Buffy mentions that Willow was the only one ever successful in actually hurting Glory up to that point. When a building collapses on top of her (see below), she was slowed down but was unharmed. Similarly, she was unharmed after being hit by a truck. 
 Superhuman strength: Glory possesses enormous physical strength far beyond that of most, if not all, vampires, demons, or Slayers; in fact, she is considered to be the most physically powerful Big Bad in the series, shown to be able to inflict massive damage on her opponents through pure brute force and physical strength alone. At one point, a building collapses on her after she repeatedly stomps her foot in a temper tantrum over a broken shoe. In "Intervention", she kicked Spike clear across her living room, through a solid wooden door, and to the other end of the room behind said door after losing her patience with him. In "Tough Love", she squeezed Tara's hand to the point where it oozed blood, right before she fed off of her brain. In "Spiral", she punches a hole through the barrier that Willow had previously generated. Even Buffy, with her slayer strength, could barely stand toe-to-toe in a fight of brawn.
 Superspeed: Glory's super-speed is depicted as a fast-moving blur that is apparently invisible to the naked eye. This is seen when she pursues Buffy and Dawn immediately after Tara, in her insane state, accidentally reveals that Dawn is the Key.
 Brain sucking: The ability to drain the mental energy of humans. This was primarily to maintain her own mental strength, but would also prevent Ben's form from resuming control. Not only does the drain draw out all energy leaving the victims in an insane state, they are also able to visually see the Key's true energy and ultimately become psychically linked to Glory and the Key.
 Shroud of illusion: A mystical shroud cast to prevent people from learning that she and Ben were the same person, the origins of which are unclear. It only works on humans; vampires, demons, and other non-humans are immune. She loses this capability in the penultimate episode of Season Five.
 Creature identification: The ability to differentiate between vampires and humans and also from any other creature from the Key, as seen in "Intervention", when her minions capture Spike under the mistaken impression that he is the Key. And also when they assume Tara is the Key and Glory quickly identifies she is not.
 Omnilingualism: Able to speak and understand any human or demon language. This is known when humans and demons would talk to her in other languages and she would easily be able to interpret and understand.
 Magic: In "Shadow", Glory cast an ancient spell that caused an ordinary snake to grow to a massive size and granted it the ability to see the true form of the Key, in addition to making it completely loyal to her. According to Giles, a spell such as that would need enormous levels of magic to perform, and Glory cast it easily.

The extent of Glory's true powers as a hell-god were never revealed or used, though according to Gregor in "Spiral", they were beyond what even her compatriot hell-gods could conceive. She later secures Ben's aid in recapturing Dawn by promising him immortality.

Personality
Clare Kramer says Glory's strength was her lack of self-doubt: "She was completely secure in herself, focused on what she wanted and dedicated to her cause." Her strength was also her downfall; Kramer notes that Glory was unable "to look at more than just herself."

According to Doug Petrie, "Joss very much wanted someone who was like the Joker to Batman. Someone who was just dynamic, charismatic and psychotic and we have all that. And Glory looks a lot better in a hot little red dress than the Joker ever did! We've got it all in Glory."

Servants
 Dreg
 Jinx
 Murk
 Slook
 Gronx
 The High Priest Minion
 Doc

Art links
The picture in the living room of Glory's mansion is a copy of Tamara de Lempicka's Group of Four Nudes. The Polish art déco/futurist artist is renowned for being strongly feminist and openly bisexual/lesbian.

In the Buffy & Angel: Official Yearbook 2006, Glory was voted number one by fans as "Best Buffyverse Villain", followed by Angelus and the Mayor respectively.

Appearances

Canonical appearances
Glory appeared in 13 canonical episodes:

 Season 5: "No Place Like Home" (first appearance); "Family"; "Shadow"; "Checkpoint"; "Blood Ties"; "I Was Made to Love You"; "Forever"; "Intervention"; "Tough Love"; "Spiral; "The Weight of the World"; "The Gift" (killed)
 Season 7: "Lessons" (as an incarnation of The First Evil)

Merchandise
The character's popularity prompted Diamond Select Toys to release two unique Glory action figures in 2006 and 2007: one figure is modeled on the character wearing her trademark red dress, and the other features the character dressed in black, as seen in "The Gift". The latter action figure was released as part of a set, with the other figure being Dawn from the same episode.

A maquette of Glory was released as part of Electric Tiki's "Tooned-Up Television" line.

See also

 List of Buffyverse Villains and Supernatural Beings
 Women warriors in literature and culture
 List of women warriors in folklore

References

Buffy the Vampire Slayer characters
Buffyverse characters who use magic
Female characters in television
Television characters introduced in 2000
Fictional characters who can move at superhuman speeds
Fictional characters with superhuman strength
Fictional characters with accelerated healing
Fictional characters with immortality
Fictional goddesses
Fictional characters from parallel universes
Fictional mass murderers
Fictional immigrants to the United States
Female villains